is a Japanese manga series written and illustrated by Mami Tsumura. It has been serialized in Shogakukan's seinen manga magazine Big Comic Superior since March 2015. A ten-episode television drama was broadcast on TV Asahi in 2021. A ten-episode Netflix original net animation (ONA) anime series adaptation produced by Liden Films, premiered worldwide in March 2022.

Premise
Kotaro Satо̄, a 4-year-old boy living on his own, moves into the apartment 203, next door to Shin Karino, a manga artist.

Characters

The eponymous 4-5-year-old main protagonist who moves into a ramshackle apartment building and becomes a next-door neighbor to manga artist Shin Karino; he also enrolls himself into a local kindergarten called Shimizu Kindergarten, where he is in the Star Class. Having the mental capacity of a mature adult, Kotaro is very independent for his age; Kotaro often carries around a plastic toy sword that he keeps around his hip, and acts like a samurai due to the love of his favorite cartoon Tonosaman. Over the course of the series, it is implied that Kotaro was neglected and abused by his parents to the point where Kotaro resorted to eating tissues. At some point, Kotaro's mother abandoned him and his father, and later died from an unknown cause; he then left his father's custody and sent himself to go live at a foster facility. When his father found his location on the internet (after seeing a picture of him with a group of other children from the facility), Kotaro left the facility and moved into the Shimizu Apartment complex to hide from his father who is actively looking for him, despite a restraining order, with flashbacks suggesting he was abusive; there are implications that Kotaro was born from an unplanned pregnancy as he once questioned himself on whether he was born out of parental love. He is unaware that his mother died after she left him and his father and instead believes that she will come back into his life one day. Since he is too young to get a job, Kotaro receives money every week from a family lawyer who secretly knows about Kotaro's family situation; because Kotaro does not know that the money actually comes from his mother's life insurance (since he is not told exactly where he is getting it from), he is only told that the money comes from a generous benefactor.

A lazy manga artist who scrapes by using prize money. Upon meeting Kotaro, Shin takes it upon himself to look out for the boy.

A rather loud neighbor of Kotaro's. Isamu is divorced and not on speaking terms with his son. Because of this, he tries to be a father to Kotaro. It is not known what his job is, but because of how he acts and looks people tend to assume he is a low-level yakuza.

 A neighbor of Kotaro's and a hostess at a local nightclub. While she puts on a brave face, especially in front of Kotaro, it is implied Mizuki is in a domestic abuse relationship, as shown when she returned home one day with a blemish on the side of her face. Halfway near the end of the series, when Kotaro learns about this, he and the other tenants become concerned; when the situation worsens, Kotaro tells her to move out of the complex for her own safety.

 A newer lawyer at the firm that handled the estate of Kotaro's deceased mother. Ayano regularly visits Kotaro to give him money from Mrs. Sato's life insurance. At the insistence of her boss, Ayano stays to play with him; she is the only one who knows the truth about Kotaro's mother being deceased. 

A private investigator hired by Kotaro's estranged father to find him. He moved into the building and built a relationship with the boy to ensure it was Kotaro. Despite the words of Shin and Isamu, Aota believed that Kotaro's father is the only one who should take care of him. However, a week after he moved in, Kotaro revealed he knew everything about Aota and Aota decided against filing the report, especially after revealing (through old scars on his upper body) that he too is a victim/survivor of child abuse. 

 One of the older kids at the foster facility that Kotaro was living at before Kotaro left due to his father finding out about his whereabouts; he and Kotaro have a special friendship as he shares his interests of photography with the young boy. He has a fondness for stargazing and even took Kotaro to go see a meteor shower with him. He is later shown working as a construction worker.

 Kotaro's kindergarten teacher.

 One of Kotaro's classmates and friends who he meets on his first day of school.

A cartoon samurai Kotaro loves to watch on TV.

Media

Manga
Kotarō wa Hitori Gurashi, written and illustrated by Mami Tsumura, started in Shogakukan's seinen manga magazine Big Comic Superior on March 13, 2015. Shogakukan has collected its chapters into individual tankōbon volumes. The first volume was published on December 28, 2015. As of June 2022, nine volumes have been released.

Volume list

Drama
A ten-episode television drama adaptation was broadcast on TV Asahi from April 24 to June 26, 2021.

Anime
In September 2021, an original net animation (ONA) anime adaptation was announced. The series is animated by Liden Films and directed by Tomoe Makino, with story composition by Hiroshi Satо̄, character designs by Tomomi Kimura, and music composed by Yūya Mori. It premiered worldwide on Netflix on March 10, 2022.

Reception
As of September 2021, the manga had over 1.4 million copies in circulation; as of June 2022, the manga had over 1.7 million copies in circulation. In 2018, Kotarō wa Hitori Gurashi won the Electronic Manga Award in the Boys' Category.

References

External links
 
 
 

2021 Japanese television series debuts
2021 Japanese television series endings
2022 anime ONAs
Anime series based on manga
Comedy anime and manga
Japanese-language Netflix original programming
Liden Films
Manga adapted into television series
Netflix original anime
Seinen manga
Shogakukan manga
Slice of life anime and manga
TV Asahi television dramas